The Light Is Leaving Us All is an album by British experimental music group Current 93. It was released on 13 October 2018 through The Spheres record label and House of Mythology. The album was performed in its entirety on 13 October 2018 in a rare performance at O2 Shepherd's Bush Empire in London, backed by a series of slow-moving films by Davide Pepe in the style of the album's artwork.

Critical reception

The Light Is Leaving Us All has received generally positive reviews from critics. Writing for Brainwashed, Anthony D'Amico praised the album, stating it "effortlessly transcends time and space and dissolves reality to open a fleeting portal into an alternate world swirling with unknowable mystery, unearthly beauty, and ineffable sadness.  At its best, this album feels like a motley and wild-eyed caravan of minstrels, actors, and puppeteers unexpectedly appeared in a medieval town to share a vividly haunting, hallucinatory, and deeply eschatological fairy tale that will be the last thing that any of the villagers ever hear." Writing for Pitchfork, Calum Marsh called it "an arduous but rewarding album, the feeling of listening to a preacher behind the pulpit, or a doomsayer on the soapbox."

Track listing

Notes
"The Policeman Is Dead" contains a sample of "A Blacksmith Courted Me" by Phoebe Smith, courtesy of Sweet David Suff and Topic Records.

Personnel
Credits adapted from liner notes.

Musicians
 David Tibet – vocals
 Andrew Liles – electric guitar, electronics
 Alasdair Roberts – vocals, acoustic guitar, electric guitar, drone hurdy gurdy, guzheng
 Reinier Van Houdt – Fender Rhodes electric piano, piano, theremin, synthesizer, bass
 Michael J. York – bagpipes, whistle, duduk, bells
 Aloma Ruiz Boada – violin
 Rita Knuistingh Neven – silent piano, sleep keys, birdlight
 Ben Chasny – doppelgänger electric guitar , doppelgänger acoustic guitar 
 Ossian Brown – hurdy gurdy
 Thomas Ligotti – ghost, voice

Technical personnel
 David Tibet – production, mixing, cover design, front cover painted photograph The Light Is Leaving Us All, back cover painted photograph The Light Is Leaving Them All, front cover of insert Bella Arises From The Wych Elm, photograph of Ben Chasny
 Andrew Liles – production, mixing, engineering
 The Bricoleur – vinyl mastering
 Stephen Thrower – photograph of Ossian Brown
 Reinier Van Houdt – photograph of Rita Knuistingh Neven
 David Ligotti – photograph of Thomas Ligotti
 Giulio Di Mauro – tour manager, centerfold photograph of Current 93
 Ania Goszczyńska – cover design, layout
 Patrick Wells – screenprinting
 Paschalis Zervas – typesetting
 Jake Gill – management
 Timothy Mark Lewis – management
 Davide Pepe – films

References

External links
 

2018 albums
Current 93 albums